The Global Centre of Rail Excellence (GCRE) is a proposed train, railway infrastructure and technology testing facility, located in Onllwyn, Wales, where the site sits on the border between Neath Port Talbot and Powys. The centre is located on a site previously used for coal mining and a coal washery, with some  given over to the new testing centre, which will be unique in Europe due to having a track for testing rail vehicles at high speed, and another test track dedicated to railway infrastructure.

History 
The site, which is at the head of the Dulais and Tawe valleys, had been used for coal production for 200 years, ending in August 2022. It was a deep-mine complex until 1980 when open-casting became the preferred method of extracting. The surface mine was named Nant Helen, and the washery was known as Onllwyn. Both locations were owned by Celtic Energy, who agreed to donate the site to the Welsh Government when coaling operations have finished. The United Kingdom has no all-purpose testing centre for railway vehicles and infrastructure, with most vehicles being tested in Europe such as at Wildenrath in Germany, or Velim, in the Czech Republic.

Development of the site has led to some hesitation on behalf of some railway companies, with some stating that as most UK production is geared up around Newton Aycliffe (Hitachi) and Derby (Bombardier/Alstom), they would prefer a location nearer to (or between) those two manufacturing sites. The GCRE site in West Wales has been viewed as being "out on a limb", although its proximity to the docks at Swansea means that the site is accessible by ship-borne delivery. Additionally, the A465 road (known as the "Heads of the Valleys road"), is to be upgraded to dual carriageway status, which will provide a viable road link to the site. In August 2020, the GCRE was given authority to proceed with conversion of the site by councillors from the Powys County, and Neath Port Talbot Councils. The GCRE site straddles the two local council areas, Neath Port Talbot and Powys.

Background 

The development of the  site was announced on 25 June 2018, and listed as costing £100 million, then at £150 million in June 2021, but by August 2022, the expected cost was £220 million. £78 million of the total amount is public money; £50 million is being provided by the Welsh Government, and £28 million by the UK Government. Whilst the primary aim is for testing facilities for trains and equipment entering service on railways across Britain, the business model of the project seeks to offer its testing services to continental railway systems (such as DB and SNCF).

The unusual shape of the loops has been dictated by the 400kV power grid which runs from Pembrokeshire to Gloucestershire; moving the pylons would have been a complex and costly task. The smaller inner loop is for infrastructure testing, which will see heavy passenger and freight trains running 16 hours a day for five days a week. This is to replicate a normal busy line, which will generate 40,000 axle passes per year, thus allowing testing and degradation on the railway infrastructure - something described as being unique in Europe. The centre is connected to the national network at Swansea via the old branch line to Onllwyn, part of the original Brecon railway. Power for the site is to be generated from local wind farms and an on-site solar farm. The owners of the site wish to make the GCRE the United Kingdom's first net zero railway.

The first phase of the site is hoped to up and running by 2023, with the centre being at full operating capability by 2025. Storage sidings are to be installed in 2023, which will generate initial revenue for the site, as storage space for railway vehicles is in short supply on the UK network.

Notes

References

Sources

External links 
Planning Documents

Railway test tracks
Proposed buildings and structures in Wales